Cigarette box may refer to:

Cigarette pack
Cigarette case